South Carolina ratified the United States Constitution on May 23, 1788. Its Senate seats were declared vacant in July 1861 owing to its secession from the Union. They were again filled from July 1868. The state's current U.S. senators are Republicans Lindsey Graham, serving since 2003, and Tim Scott, serving since 2013.

List of senators

|- style="height:2em"
! rowspan=4 | 1
| rowspan=4 align=left | Pierce Butler
|  | Pro-Admin.
| rowspan=4 nowrap | Mar 4, 1789 –Oct 25, 1796
| rowspan=2 | Elected in 1789.
| rowspan=2 | 1
| 
| rowspan=3 | 1
| rowspan=3 | Elected in 1789.
| rowspan=3 nowrap | Mar 4, 1789 –Mar 3, 1795
| rowspan=3  | Pro-Admin.
| rowspan=3 align=right | Ralph Izard
! rowspan=3 | 1

|- style="height:2em"
| rowspan=2  | Anti-Admin.
| 

|- style="height:2em"
| rowspan=2 | Re-elected in 1793.Resigned.
| rowspan=6 | 2
| 

|- style="height:2em"
|  | Democratic-Republican
| 
| rowspan=6 | 2
| rowspan=6 | Elected in 1794 or 1795.Lost re-election.
| rowspan=6 nowrap | Mar 4, 1795 –Mar 3, 1801
| rowspan=6  | Federalist
| rowspan=6 align=right | Jacob Read
! rowspan=6 | 2

|- style="height:2em"
| colspan=3 | Vacant
| nowrap | Oct 25, 1796 –Dec 8, 1796
|  

|- style="height:2em"
! rowspan=2 | 2
| rowspan=2 align=left | John Hunter
| rowspan=2  | Democratic-Republican
| rowspan=2 nowrap | Dec 8, 1796 –Nov 26, 1798
| rowspan=2 | Elected to finish Butler's term.Resigned.

|- style="height:2em"
| 

|- style="height:2em"
! rowspan=3 | 3
| rowspan=3 align=left | Charles Pinckney
| rowspan=3  | Democratic-Republican
| rowspan=3 nowrap | Dec 6, 1798 –Jun 6, 1801
| Elected to finish Butler's term.

|- style="height:2em"
| rowspan=2 | Re-elected in 1799.Resigned to become U.S. Minister to Spain.
| rowspan=9 | 3
| 

|- style="height:2em"
| 
| rowspan=9 | 3
| rowspan=3 | Elected in 1800.Died.
| rowspan=3 nowrap | Mar 4, 1801 –Oct 26, 1802
| rowspan=3  | Democratic-Republican
| rowspan=3 align=right | John E. Colhoun
! rowspan=3 | 3

|- style="height:2em"
| colspan=3 | Vacant
| nowrap | Jun 6, 1801 –Dec 15, 1801
|  

|- style="height:2em"
! rowspan=9 | 4
| rowspan=9 align=left | Thomas Sumter
| rowspan=9  | Democratic-Republican
| rowspan=9 nowrap | Dec 15, 1801 –Dec 16, 1810
| rowspan=6 | Elected in 1801 to finish Pinckney's term.

|- style="height:2em"
|  
| nowrap | Oct 26, 1802 –Nov 4, 1802
| colspan=3 | Vacant

|- style="height:2em"
| rowspan=2 | Elected to finish Colhoun's term.Resigned.
| rowspan=2 nowrap | Nov 4, 1802 –Nov 21, 1804
| rowspan=2  | Democratic-Republican
| rowspan=2 align=right | Pierce Butler
! rowspan=2 | 4

|- style="height:2em"
| 

|- style="height:2em"
|  
| nowrap | Nov 21, 1804 –Dec 6, 1804
| colspan=3 | Vacant

|- style="height:2em"
| rowspan=2 | Elected to finish Butler's term.
| rowspan=16 nowrap | Dec 6, 1804 –Feb 26, 1826
| rowspan=15  | Democratic-Republican
| rowspan=16 align=right | John Gaillard
! rowspan=16 | 5

|- style="height:2em"
| rowspan=3 | Re-elected in 1804.Resigned.
| rowspan=5 | 4
| 

|- style="height:2em"
| 
| rowspan=5 | 4
| rowspan=5 | Re-elected in 1806.

|- style="height:2em"
| 

|- style="height:2em"
| colspan=3 | Vacant
| nowrap | Dec 16, 1810 –Dec 31, 1810
|  

|- style="height:2em"
! rowspan=4 | 5
| rowspan=4 align=left | John Taylor
| rowspan=4  | Democratic-Republican
| rowspan=4 nowrap | Dec 31, 1810 –Nov 1816
| Elected to finish Sumter's term.

|- style="height:2em"
| rowspan=3 |  Re-elected in 1810.Resigned.
| rowspan=5 | 5
| 

|- style="height:2em"
| 
| rowspan=5 | 5
| rowspan=5 | Re-elected in 1812.

|- style="height:2em"
| 

|- style="height:2em"
| colspan=3 | Vacant
| nowrap | Nov 1816 –Dec 4, 1816
|  

|- style="height:2em"
! rowspan=4 | 6
| rowspan=4 align=left | William Smith
| rowspan=4  | Democratic-Republican
| rowspan=4 nowrap | Dec 4, 1816 –Mar 3, 1823
| Elected to finish Taylor's term.

|- style="height:2em"
| rowspan=3 | Re-elected in 1816.Lost re-election.
| rowspan=3 | 6
| 

|- style="height:2em"
| 
| rowspan=3 | 6
| rowspan=3 | Re-elected in 1818.

|- style="height:2em"
| 

|- style="height:2em"
! rowspan=8 | 7
| rowspan=8 align=left | Robert Y. Hayne
|  | Democratic-Republican
| rowspan=8 nowrap | Mar 4, 1823 –Dec 13, 1832
| rowspan=6 | Elected in 1822.
| rowspan=6 | 7
| 

|- style="height:2em"
| rowspan=6  | Jacksonian
| 
| rowspan=6 | 7
| Re-elected in 1824.Died.
|  | Jacksonian

|- style="height:2em"
|  
| nowrap | Feb 26, 1826 –Mar 8, 1826
| colspan=3 | Vacant

|- style="height:2em"
| Appointed to continue Gaillard's term.
| nowrap | Mar 8, 1826 –Nov 29, 1826
|  | Jacksonian
| align=right | William Harper
! 6

|- style="height:2em"
| rowspan=3 | Elected to finish Gaillard's term.Lost re-election.
| rowspan=3 nowrap | Nov 29, 1826 –Mar 3, 1831
| rowspan=3  | Jacksonian
| rowspan=3 align=right | William Smith
! rowspan=3 | 7

|- style="height:2em"
| 

|- style="height:2em"
| rowspan=2 | Re-elected in 1828.Resigned to become South Carolina Governor.
| rowspan=6 | 8
| 

|- style="height:2em"
|  | Nullifier
| 
| rowspan=6 | 8
| rowspan=3 | Elected in 1830.Resigned due to ill health.
| rowspan=3 nowrap | Mar 4, 1831 –Mar 3, 1833
| rowspan=3  | Nullifier
| rowspan=3 align=right |
Stephen Decatur Miller
! rowspan=3 | 8

|- style="height:2em"
| colspan=3 | Vacant
| nowrap | Dec 13, 1832 –Dec 29, 1832
|  

|- style="height:2em"
! rowspan=9 | 8
| rowspan=9 align=left | John C. Calhoun
| rowspan=4  | Nullifier
| rowspan=9 nowrap | Dec 29, 1832 –Mar 3, 1843
| rowspan=3 | Elected to finish Hayne's term.

|- style="height:2em"
| 
|  
| nowrap | Mar 3, 1833 –Nov 26, 1833
| colspan=3 | Vacant

|- style="height:2em"
| rowspan=2 | Elected to finish Miller's term.
| rowspan=5 nowrap | Nov 26, 1833 –Nov 29, 1842
| rowspan=2  | Nullifier
| rowspan=5 align=right | William C. Preston
! rowspan=5 | 9

|- style="height:2em"
| rowspan=3 | Re-elected in 1834.
| rowspan=3 | 9
| 

|- style="height:2em"
| rowspan=5  | Democratic
| 
| rowspan=5 | 9
| rowspan=3 | Re-elected in 1837.
| rowspan=3  | Whig

|- style="height:2em"
| 

|- style="height:2em"
| rowspan=3 | Re-elected in 1840.Resigned.
| rowspan=8 | 10
| 

|- style="height:2em"
|  
| nowrap | Nov 29, 1842 –Dec 23, 1842
| colspan=3 | Vacant

|- style="height:2em"
| Elected to finish Preston's term.
| rowspan=4 nowrap | Dec 23, 1842 –Aug 17, 1846
| rowspan=4  | Democratic
| rowspan=4 align=right | George McDuffie
! rowspan=4 | 10

|- style="height:2em"
! 9
| align=left | 
Daniel Elliott Huger
|  | Democratic
| nowrap | Mar 4, 1843 –Mar 3, 1845
| Elected to finish Calhoun's term.Resigned.
| 
| rowspan=6 | 10
| rowspan=3 | Re-elected in 1842 or 1843.

|- style="height:2em"
| colspan=3 | Vacant
| nowrap | Mar 3, 1845 –Nov 26, 1845
|  
| 

|- style="height:2em"
! rowspan=5 | 10
| rowspan=5 align=left | John C. Calhoun
| rowspan=5  | Democratic
| rowspan=5 nowrap | Nov 26, 1845 –Mar 31, 1850
| rowspan=3 | Re-elected to finish his own term.

|- style="height:2em"
|  
| nowrap | Aug 17, 1846 –Dec 4, 1846
| colspan=3 | Vacant

|- style="height:2em"
| rowspan=2 | Appointed to continue McDuffie's term.Elected to finish McDuffie's term.
| rowspan=15 nowrap | Dec 4, 1846 –May 25, 1857
| rowspan=15  | Democratic
| rowspan=15 align=right | Andrew Butler
! rowspan=15 | 11

|- style="height:2em"
| rowspan=2 | Re-elected in 1846.Died.
| rowspan=11 | 11
| 

|- style="height:2em"
| 
| rowspan=11 | 11
| rowspan=11 | Re-elected in 1848.

|- style="height:2em"
| colspan=3 | Vacant
| nowrap | Mar 31, 1850 –Apr 11, 1850
|  

|- style="height:2em"
! 11
| align=left | Franklin H. Elmore
|  | Democratic
| nowrap | Apr 11, 1850 –May 29, 1850
| Appointed to continue Calhoun's term.Died.

|- style="height:2em"
| colspan=3 | Vacant
| nowrap | May 29, 1850 –Jun 4, 1850
|  

|- style="height:2em"
! 12
| align=left | Robert W. Barnwell
|  | Democratic
| nowrap | Jun 4, 1850 –Dec 8, 1850
| Appointed to continue Elmore's term.Retired when his successor was elected.

|- style="height:2em"
| colspan=3 | Vacant
| nowrap | Dec 8, 1850 –Dec 18, 1850
|  

|- style="height:2em"
! rowspan=2 | 13
| rowspan=2 align=left | Robert Rhett
| rowspan=2  | Democratic
| rowspan=2 nowrap | Dec 18, 1850 –May 7, 1852
| rowspan=2 | Elected to finish Elmore's term.Resigned.

|- style="height:2em"
| 

|- style="height:2em"
| colspan=3 | Vacant
| nowrap | May 7, 1852 –May 10, 1852
|  

|- style="height:2em"
! 14
| align=left | William F. De Saussure
|  | Democratic
| nowrap | May 10, 1852 –Mar 3, 1853
| Appointed to continue Rhett's term.Elected Nov 29, 1852

|- style="height:2em"
! rowspan=5 | 15
| rowspan=5 align=left | Josiah Evans
| rowspan=5  | Democratic
| rowspan=5 nowrap | Mar 4, 1853 –May 6, 1858
| rowspan=5 | Elected in 1852 or 1853.Died.
| rowspan=8 | 12
| 

|- style="height:2em"
| 
| rowspan=10 | 12
| rowspan=2 | Re-elected in 1854.Died.

|- style="height:2em"
| 

|- style="height:2em"
|  
| nowrap | May 25, 1857 –Dec 7, 1857
| colspan=3 | Vacant

|- style="height:2em"
| rowspan=6 | Elected to finish Butler's term.Withdrew.
| rowspan=6 nowrap | Dec 7, 1857 –Nov 11, 1860
| rowspan=6  | Democratic
| rowspan=6 align=right | James Henry Hammond
! rowspan=6 | 12

|- style="height:2em"
| colspan=3 | Vacant
| nowrap | May 6, 1858 –May 11, 1858
|  

|- style="height:2em"
! 16
| align=left | Arthur P. Hayne
|  | Democratic
| nowrap | May 11, 1858 –Dec 2, 1858
| Appointed to continue Evans' term.Retired when his successor was elected.

|- style="height:2em"
! rowspan=2 | 17
| rowspan=2 align=left | James Chesnut Jr.
| rowspan=2  | Democratic
| rowspan=2 nowrap | Dec 3, 1858 –Nov 10, 1860
| Elected to finish Evans' term.

|- style="height:2em"
| Re-elected in 1858.Withdrew and was later expelled for his support of the Confederacy.
| rowspan=5 | 13
| 

|- style="height:2em"
| rowspan=6 colspan=3 | Vacant
| rowspan=6 nowrap | Nov 10, 1860 –Jul 15, 1868
| rowspan=6 | Civil War and Reconstruction.

|- style="height:2em"
| rowspan=6 | Civil War and Reconstruction.
| rowspan=6 nowrap | Nov 11, 1860 –Jul 16, 1868
| rowspan=6 colspan=3 | Vacant

|- style="height:2em"
| 
| rowspan=3 | 13

|- style="height:2em"
| 

|- style="height:2em"
| rowspan=5 | 14
| 

|- style="height:2em"
| 
| rowspan=5 | 14

|- style="height:2em"
! rowspan=6 | 18
| rowspan=6 align=left | Thomas J. Robertson
| rowspan=6  | Republican
| rowspan=6 nowrap | Jul 15, 1868 –Mar 3, 1877
| rowspan=3 | Elected to finish the vacant term.

|- style="height:2em"
| rowspan=3 | Elected to finish the vacant term.
| rowspan=3 nowrap | Jul 16, 1868 –Mar 3, 1873
| rowspan=3  | Republican
| rowspan=3 align=right | Frederick A. Sawyer
! rowspan=3 | 13

|- style="height:2em"
| 

|- style="height:2em"
| rowspan=3 | Re-elected in 1870.Retired.
| rowspan=3 | 15
| 

|- style="height:2em"
| 
| rowspan=3 | 15
| rowspan=3 | Elected in 1872 or 1873.
| rowspan=3 nowrap | Mar 4, 1873 –Mar 3, 1879
| rowspan=3  | Republican
| rowspan=3 align=right | John J. Patterson
! rowspan=3 | 14

|- style="height:2em"
| 

|- style="height:2em"
! rowspan=9 | 19
| rowspan=9 align=left | Matthew Butler
| rowspan=9  | Democratic
| rowspan=9 nowrap | Mar 4, 1877 –Mar 3, 1895
| rowspan=3 | Elected in 1876.
| rowspan=3 | 16
| 

|- style="height:2em"
| 
| rowspan=3 | 16
| rowspan=3 | Elected in 1878.
| rowspan=6 nowrap | Mar 4, 1879 –Mar 3, 1891
| rowspan=6  | Democratic
| rowspan=6 align=right | Wade Hampton III
! rowspan=6 | 15

|- style="height:2em"
| 

|- style="height:2em"
| rowspan=3 | Re-elected in 1882.
| rowspan=3 | 17
| 

|- style="height:2em"
| 
| rowspan=3 | 17
| rowspan=3 | Re-elected in 1884.Lost re-election.

|- style="height:2em"
| 

|- style="height:2em"
| rowspan=3 | Re-elected in 1888.Lost renomination.
| rowspan=3 | 18
| 

|- style="height:2em"
| 
| rowspan=3 | 18
| rowspan=3 | Elected in 1890.Retired.
| rowspan=3 nowrap | Mar 4, 1891 –Mar 3, 1897
| rowspan=3  | Democratic
| rowspan=3 align=right | John L. M. Irby
! rowspan=3 | 16

|- style="height:2em"
| 

|- style="height:2em"
! rowspan=16 | 20
| rowspan=16 align=left | Benjamin Tillman
| rowspan=16  | Democratic
| rowspan=16 nowrap | Mar 4, 1895 –Jul 3, 1918
| rowspan=5 | Elected in 1894.
| rowspan=5 | 19
| 

|- style="height:2em"
| 
| rowspan=5 | 19
| Elected in 1897.Died.
| nowrap | Mar 4, 1897 –May 20, 1897
|  | Democratic
| align=right | Joseph Earle
! 17

|- style="height:2em"
|  
| nowrap | May 20, 1897 –May 27, 1897
| colspan=3 | Vacant

|- style="height:2em"
| rowspan=3 | Appointed to continue Earle's term.Elected in 1898 to finish Earle's term.Retired.
| rowspan=3 nowrap | May 27, 1897 –Mar 3, 1903
| rowspan=3  | Democratic
| rowspan=3 align=right | John McLaurin
! rowspan=3 | 18

|- style="height:2em"
| 

|- style="height:2em"
| rowspan=3 | Re-elected in 1901.
| rowspan=3 | 20
| 

|- style="height:2em"
| 
| rowspan=5 | 20
| rowspan=3 | Elected in 1903.Died.
| rowspan=3 nowrap | Mar 4, 1903 –Feb 20, 1908
| rowspan=3  | Democratic
| rowspan=3 align=right | Asbury Latimer
! rowspan=3 | 19

|- style="height:2em"
| 

|- style="height:2em"
| rowspan=5 | Re-elected in 1907.
| rowspan=5 | 21
| 

|- style="height:2em"
|  
| nowrap | Feb 20, 1908 –Mar 6, 1908
| colspan=3 | Vacant

|- style="height:2em"
| Elected in 1908 to finish Latimer's term.Retired.
| nowrap | Mar 6, 1908 –Mar 3, 1909
|  | Democratic
| align=right | Frank B. Gary
! 20

|- style="height:2em"
| 
| rowspan=3 | 21
| rowspan=3 | Elected in 1909.
| rowspan=25 nowrap | Mar 4, 1909 –Nov 17, 1944
| rowspan=25  | Democratic
| rowspan=25 align=right | Ellison D. Smith
! rowspan=25 | 21

|- style="height:2em"
| 

|- style="height:2em"
| rowspan=3 | Re-elected in 1913.Died.
| rowspan=6 | 22
| 

|- style="height:2em"
| 
| rowspan=6 | 22
| rowspan=6 | Re-elected in 1914.

|- style="height:2em"
| 

|- style="height:2em"
| colspan=3 | Vacant
| nowrap | Jul 3, 1918 –Jul 6, 1918
|  

|- style="height:2em"
! 21
| align=left | Christie Benet
|  | Democratic
| nowrap | Jul 6, 1918 –Nov 5, 1918
| Appointed to continue Tillman's term.Lost election to finish Tillman's term.

|- style="height:2em"
! 22
| align=left | William P. Pollock
|  | Democratic
| nowrap | Nov 6, 1918 –Mar 3, 1919
| Elected to finish Tillman's term.Retired.

|- style="height:2em"
! rowspan=3 | 23
| rowspan=3 align=left | Nathaniel Dial
| rowspan=3  | Democratic
| rowspan=3 nowrap | Mar 4, 1919 –Mar 3, 1925
| rowspan=3 | Elected in 1918.Lost renomination.
| rowspan=3 | 23
| 

|- style="height:2em"
| 
| rowspan=3 | 23
| rowspan=3 | Re-elected in 1920.

|- style="height:2em"
| 

|- style="height:2em"
! rowspan=3 | 24
| rowspan=3 align=left | Coleman Blease
| rowspan=3  | Democratic
| rowspan=3 nowrap | Mar 4, 1925 –Mar 3, 1931
| rowspan=3 | Elected in 1924.Lost renomination.
| rowspan=3 | 24
| 

|- style="height:2em"
| 
| rowspan=3 | 24
| rowspan=3 | Re-elected in 1926.

|- style="height:2em"
| 

|- style="height:2em"
! rowspan=6 | 25
| rowspan=6 align=left | James F. Byrnes
| rowspan=6  | Democratic
| rowspan=6 nowrap | Mar 4, 1931 –Jul 8, 1941
| rowspan=3 | Elected in 1930.
| rowspan=3 | 25
| 

|- style="height:2em"
| 
| rowspan=3 | 25
| rowspan=3 | Re-elected in 1932.

|- style="height:2em"
| 

|- style="height:2em"
| rowspan=3 | Re-elected in 1936.Resigned to become a Justice of the U.S. Supreme Court.

| rowspan=7 | 26
| 

|- style="height:2em"
| 
| rowspan=9 | 26
| rowspan=7 | Re-elected in 1938.Lost renomination before dying.

|- style="height:2em"
| 

|- style="height:2em"
| colspan=3 | Vacant
| nowrap | Jul 8, 1941 –Jul 22, 1941
|  

|- style="height:2em"
! 26
| align=left | Alva Lumpkin
|  | Democratic
| nowrap | Jul 22, 1941 –Aug 1, 1941
| Appointed to continue Byrnes's term.Died.

|- style="height:2em"
! 27
| align=left | Roger Peace
|  | Democratic
| nowrap | Aug 5, 1941 –Nov 4, 1941
| Appointed to continue Byrnes's term.Retired when successor elected.

|- style="height:2em"
! rowspan=9 | 28
| rowspan=9 align=left | Burnet R. Maybank
| rowspan=9  | Democratic
| rowspan=9 nowrap | Nov 5, 1941 –Sep 1, 1954
| Elected to finish Byrnes's term.

|- style="height:2em"
| rowspan=5 | Re-elected in 1942.
| rowspan=5 | 27
| 

|- style="height:2em"
|  
| nowrap | Nov 17, 1944 –Nov 20, 1944
| colspan=3 | Vacant

|- style="height:2em"
| Appointed to finish Smith's term.Retired when successor was elected to the next full term.
| nowrap | Nov 20, 1944 –Jan 3, 1945
|  | Democratic
| align=right | Wilton E. Hall
! 22

|- style="height:2em"
| 
| rowspan=3 | 27
| rowspan=3 | Elected in 1944.
| rowspan=17 nowrap | Jan 3, 1945 –Apr 18, 1965
| rowspan=17  | Democratic
| rowspan=17 align=right | Olin D. Johnston
! rowspan=17 | 23

|- style="height:2em"
| 

|- style="height:2em"
| rowspan=3 | Re-elected in 1948.Died.
| rowspan=6 | 28
| 

|- style="height:2em"
| 
| rowspan=8 | 28
| rowspan=8 | Re-elected in 1950.

|- style="height:2em"
| 

|- style="height:2em"
| colspan=3 | Vacant
| nowrap | Sep 1, 1954 –Sep 6, 1954
|  

|- style="height:2em"
! 29
| align=left | Charles E. Daniel
|  | Democratic
| nowrap | Sep 6, 1954 –Dec 23, 1954
| Appointed to finish Maybank's term.Resigned early to give successor preferential seniority.

|- style="height:2em"
! rowspan=2 | 30
| rowspan=2 align=left | Strom Thurmond
| rowspan=2   | Democratic
| rowspan=2 nowrap | Dec 24, 1954 –Apr 4, 1956
| Appointed to finish Maybank's term, having been elected to the next term.

|- style="height:2em"
| Elected in 1954.Resigned.
| rowspan=5 | 29
| 

|- style="height:2em"
! 31
| align=left | Thomas A. Wofford
|  | Democratic
| nowrap | Apr 5, 1956 –Nov 6, 1956
| Appointed to continue Thurmond's term.Retired.

|- style="height:2em"
! rowspan=28 | 32
| rowspan=28 align=left | Strom Thurmond
| rowspan=5  | Democratic
| rowspan=28 nowrap | Nov 7, 1956 –Jan 3, 2003
| rowspan=3 | Elected in 1956 to finish his own term.

|- style="height:2em"
| 
| rowspan=3| 29
| rowspan=3 | Re-elected in 1956.

|- style="height:2em"
| 

|- style="height:2em"
| rowspan=7 | Re-elected in 1960.Changed parties Sep 16, 1964.
| rowspan=7 | 30
| 

|- style="height:2em"
| 
| rowspan=7 | 30
| rowspan=3 | Re-elected in 1962.Died.

|- style="height:2em"
| rowspan=23   | Republican

|- style="height:2em"
| 

|- style="height:2em"
|  
| nowrap | Apr 18, 1965 –Apr 22, 1965
| colspan=3 | Vacant

|- style="height:2em"
| Appointed to continue Johnston's term.Lost nomination to finish Johnston's term.
| nowrap | Apr 22, 1965 –Nov 8, 1966
|  | Democratic
| align=right | Donald S. Russell
! 24

|- style="height:2em"
| rowspan=2 | Elected to finish Johnston's term.
| rowspan=20 nowrap | Nov 9, 1966 –Jan 3, 2005
| rowspan=20  | Democratic
| rowspan=20 align=right | Fritz Hollings
! rowspan=20 | 25

|- style="height:2em"
| rowspan=3 | Re-elected in 1966.
| rowspan=3 | 31
| 

|- style="height:2em"
| 
| rowspan=3| 31
| rowspan=3 | Re-elected in 1968.

|- style="height:2em"
| 

|- style="height:2em"
| rowspan=3 | Re-elected in 1972.
| rowspan=3 | 32
| 

|- style="height:2em"
| 
| rowspan=3 | 32
| rowspan=3 | Re-elected in 1974.

|- style="height:2em"
| 

|- style="height:2em"
| rowspan=3 | Re-elected in 1978.
| rowspan=3 | 33
| 

|- style="height:2em"
| 
| rowspan=3 | 33
| rowspan=3 | Re-elected in 1980.

|- style="height:2em"
| 

|- style="height:2em"
| rowspan=3 | Re-elected in 1984.
| rowspan=3 | 34
| 

|- style="height:2em"
| 
| rowspan=3 | 34
| rowspan=3 | Re-elected in 1986.

|- style="height:2em"
| 

|- style="height:2em"
| rowspan=3 | Re-elected in 1990.
| rowspan=3 | 35
| 

|- style="height:2em"
| 
| rowspan=3 | 35
| rowspan=3 | Re-elected in 1992.

|- style="height:2em"
| 

|- style="height:2em"
| rowspan=3 | Re-elected in 1996.Retired.
| rowspan=3 | 36
| 

|- style="height:2em"
| 
| rowspan=3 | 36
| rowspan=3 | Re-elected in 1998.Retired.

|- style="height:2em"
| 

|- style="height:2em"
! rowspan=13 | 33
| rowspan=13 align=left | Lindsey Graham
| rowspan=13  | Republican
| rowspan=13 nowrap | Jan 3, 2003 –Present
| rowspan=3 | Elected in 2002.
| rowspan=3 | 37
| 

|- style="height:2em"
| 
| rowspan=3 | 37
| rowspan=3 | Elected in 2004.
| rowspan=4 nowrap | Jan 3, 2005 –Jan 2, 2013
| rowspan=4  | Republican
| rowspan=4 align=right | Jim DeMint
! rowspan=4 | 26

|- style="height:2em"
| 

|- style="height:2em"
| rowspan=4 | Re-elected in 2008.
| rowspan=4 | 38
| 

|- style="height:2em"
| 
| rowspan=4 | 38
| Re-elected in 2010.Resigned.

|- style="height:2em"
| rowspan=3 | Appointed to continue DeMint's term.Elected in 2014 to finish DeMint's term.
| rowspan=9 nowrap | Jan 2, 2013 –Present
| rowspan=9  | Republican
| rowspan=9 align=right | Tim Scott
! rowspan=9 | 27

|- style="height:2em"
| 

|- style="height:2em"
| rowspan=3 | Re-elected in 2014.
| rowspan=3 | 39
| 

|- style="height:2em"
| 
| rowspan=3 | 39
| rowspan=3 | Re-elected in 2016.

|- style="height:2em"
| 

|- style="height:2em"
| rowspan=3|Re-elected in 2020.
| rowspan=3 |40
| 

|- style="height:2em"
| 
| rowspan=3|40
| rowspan=3| Re-elected in 2022.  Retiring at the end of the term. 

|- style="height:2em"
| 

|- style="height:2em"
| rowspan=2 colspan=5 | To be determined in the 2026 election.
| rowspan=2 |41
| 

|- style="height:2em"
| 
| 41
| colspan=5 | To be determined in the 2028 election.

See also

 List of United States representatives from South Carolina
 United States congressional delegations from South Carolina
 Elections in South Carolina

Notes

References 
 

 
United States senators
South Carolina